El México Que Se Nos Fue ("The Mexico that got away from us") is the twenty-second studio album by Juan Gabriel, released in 1995. The album  won the Lo Nuestro Award for Regional Mexican Album of the Year.

Track listing

Album certification

References 

Juan Gabriel albums
1995 albums
Regional Mexican music albums